"Crying in the Chapel" is song by Australian pop singer Peter Blakeley. The song was released in November 1989 as the lead single from Blakeley's second studio album, Harry's Café De Wheels (1990). It was Blakeley's first single to receive commercial success, peaking at #3 on the ARIA Singles chart, and was certified Platinum.

At the ARIA Music Awards of 1990, "Crying in the Chapel" won ARIA Award for Single of the Year. The song also earned Blakeley a nomination for ARIA Award for Best Male Artist and ARIA Award for Song of the Year.

Track listings

7" Single
Side A "Crying in the Chapel" - 3:40
Side B "Caterina" - 3:30

12" Single
Side A "Crying in the Chapel" (The Jungle Mix) - 6:15
Side B "Crying in the Chapel" (The Jungle Dub)- 5:40

CD single
 "Crying in the Chapel" - 3:40
 "Caterina" - 3:30
 "Vicious" - 3:50
 "Crying in the Chapel" (The Jungle Mix) - 6:15

Charts

Weekly charts

Year-end charts

Certifications

References

1989 singles
1989 songs
ARIA Award-winning songs
Songs written by Aaron Zigman